Wardour  is a settlement in Wiltshire, England, about  west of Salisbury and  south of Hindon. Formerly a parish in its own right, it is now part of the civil parish of Tisbury.

History
A bronze age hoard known as the Wardour Hoard has been found in the village.

The land was an estate of Wilton Abbey by the 11th century.

The 15th-century Wardour Castle was slighted during the English Civil War, The stronghold was replaced in 1776 by New Wardour Castle, built between 1769 and 1776. It was long the home of the Lords Arundell of Wardour and later of Cranborne Chase School.

All Saints' Roman Catholic chapel, Wardour, originally belonged to the Arundells' household. It was enlarged in 1788 by the eighth Lord Arundell to the designs of Giacomo Quarenghi and John Soane. The chapel still has regular services and is also used for musical events.

In the 18th century part of the estate was in Tisbury parish and part in Donhead St Andrew.  In 1835 Tisbury was divided into three parishes: East Tisbury, West Tisbury and Wardour.  In 1927 East Tisbury and Wardour were united as Tisbury civil parish.

Wardour Catholic Primary School was built in 1862.

John Marius Wilson's Imperial Gazetteer of England and Wales (1870-1872) said of Wardour:

Quarrying
The parish was noted for its quarrying, particularly Chilmark Stone, Tisbury Stone and Vale of Wardour Stone. Chicksgrove Quarry was operated near Tisbury in the Vale of Wardour. The Purbeck beds in Wardour have long been abandoned.

Notable people
 The Arundell baronetcy
 Lucy Neville-Rolfe (born at Wardour in 1953), senior civil servant, businesswoman and politician
 Nicholas Hyde (born at Wardour c.1572), Lord Chief Justice of England

References

Villages in Wiltshire
Former civil parishes in Wiltshire